Dhakal is a 
Bahun (बाहुन)/Kshetri(क्षेत्री) surname found in Nepal and in some parts of India (Uttarakhand, Sikkim). They are pahari  people and of Indo-Aryan origin.

The Dhakals are believed to be the direct descendants of Rishi or sage Upamanyu, who is in turn believed to be descended from Rishi Vasishta. They are believed to have originated from a place called Dhapuk in the Achham Districts and Gorkha Districts. The Sikkimese Dhakals were settled in terai parts of kingdom of Sikkim and later migrated to the hills for the purpose of rearing cattle. Dhakals from mid-western Nepal migrated towards the east including Syanja, Gorkha, and all the way to eastern Nepal. Dhakals were engaged in priestly and astrological works done by Bahun priests in the Kingdom of Gorkha. Astrologer Kulananda Dhakal used to counsel King Prithvi Narayan Shah before war. Yaku {Bhojpur and Gorkha} is known as the Birta of Dhakal; Syanja, Gorkha, Terathum, Bhojpur and Gorkha are famous places from which many Dhakals have emerged.

Culture
The culture is a part the traditional Nepali-Hinduism Brahmin

Notable people

Baburam Dhakal (born 1979), Nepalese film director
Biswas Dhakal (born 1981), Nepalese entrepreneur
Ek Nath Dhakal (born 1974), politician
Hari Dhakal, (born 1981) member of the House of Representatives 2022
Janardan Dhakal, from Rasuwa, Nepalese politician
Kulananda Dhakal, chief priest and astrologer of the 18th-century ruler Prithvi Narayan Shah
Ram Krishna Dhakal (born 1974), singer
Ramnath Dhakal (1962-2015), Nepalese politician
Rishi Dhakal,  US based Nepalese businessman,  honorary  Consul General  California United States of America
Sagar Dhakal, Nepalese cricketer
Shobhakar Dhakal, Head of Department of Energy, Environment and Climate Change at AIT, Thailand
Shyam Dhakal, (born 1981) alpine skier from Nepal.

References 

Surnames of Nepalese origin
Brahmin communities
Nepali-language surnames
Khas surnames